The Cabinet of Antigua and Barbuda is the executive branch of the government of Antigua and Barbuda.

References 

Government of Antigua and Barbuda
Politics of Antigua and Barbuda
Antigua and Barbuda